Matches played by the American basketball team Miami Heat have been broadcast since its founding in 1988. Radio commentaries have been broadcast in English and Spanish: the English commentaries have been broadcast on the WAXY channel since 2011, and those in Spanish on WQBA since 2004. Matches have been televised on Sun Sports and its predecessors. The teams of commentators include a play-by-play commentator, a color commentator, a courtside reporter, and a studio host.

Television

2010s

2000s

1990s

1980s

English radio

2010s

2000s

1990s

1980s

Spanish radio

2010s

2000s

1990s

1980s

See also 
 List of current National Basketball Association broadcasters

Notes

The Sunshine Network became Sun Sports during the 2004–05 NBA season.
When Mike Fratello called games for the NBA on TNT, Ed Pinckney and Tony Fiorentino were used as a fill-ins.
Tony Fiorentino replaced Mike Fratello during the 2004–05 NBA season after Fratello became the Memphis Grizzlies head coach.

Broadcasters
Lists of National Basketball Association broadcasters
broadcasters
SportsChannel
Fox Sports Networks
Bally Sports